Somatidia waitei is a species of beetle in the family Cerambycidae. It was described by Broun in 1911. It is known from the Chatham Islands.

References

waitei
Beetles described in 1911